Ilya Vasilyevich Rashchenya (born 27 May 1997) is a Belarusian professional footballer who plays for Russian club Volgar Astrakhan.

References

External links 
 
 

1997 births
Living people
Belarusian footballers
Belarus youth international footballers
Belarus under-21 international footballers
Association football defenders
FC Energetik-BGU Minsk players
FC Smolevichi players
FC Slutsk players
FC Volgar Astrakhan players
Crimean Premier League players
Belarusian Premier League players
Belarusian First League players
Russian First League players
Belarusian expatriate footballers
Expatriate footballers in Russia
Belarusian expatriate sportspeople in Russia